Michael Russell was the defending champion, but decided not to participate.
Alex Bogomolov Jr. defeated Amer Delić 5–7, 7–6(7), 6–3 in the final to win the tournament.

Seeds

Draw

Finals

Top half

Bottom half

References
 Main Draw
 Qualifying Draw

JSM Challenger of Champaign-Urbana - Singles
JSM Challenger of Champaign–Urbana